Carlowville is an unincorporated community in Dallas County, Alabama.   A portion of Carlowville was designated as the Carlowville Historic District on the National Register of Historic Places on January 18, 1978, the Carlowville Historic District.

Demographics

Carlowville was listed on the 1880 U.S. Census as an unincorporated community with a population of 154. It has not been listed on the census since, though the census division of Dallas County it is located within still bears that name to date.

Notable people
Nathaniel Sextus Colley

References

Unincorporated communities in Alabama
Unincorporated communities in Dallas County, Alabama